Bagbanlar may refer to:
Bağbanlar (disambiguation), several places in Azerbaijan
Bagbanlar, Ganja, Azerbaijan